Giorgio Galli (born 11 February 1996) is an Italian professional footballer who plays as a midfielder for  club Lecco.

Club career 
Starting his youth career at Monza, Galli first began his senior career in the Serie D at Caronnese during the 2014–15 season. In three years at the club, Galli played 81 games and scored seven goals. In 2017 he returned to Serie C club Monza, where he played 76 games, helping Monza gain promotion to the Serie B in 2019–20. On 25 August 2020, Galli joined Serie C club Lecco.

Honours
Monza
 Serie C Group A: 2019–20

References

External links
 

1996 births
Living people
Sportspeople from Como
Footballers from Lombardy
Italian footballers
Association football midfielders
Serie C players
Serie D players
S.C. Caronnese S.S.D. players
A.C. Monza players
Calcio Lecco 1912 players